Chandubhai Deshmukh (1940–1998) was a leader of Bharatiya Janata Party from Gujarat. He was elected to the Lok Sabha, lower house of the Parliament of India from the Baroach constituency four times. He was a member of Gujarat Legislative Assembly during 1977-79 period and served as a cabinet minister holding Forests, Tribal Welfare and Rural Housing portfolios in ministry headed by Babubhai Patel.

References

1940 births
1998 deaths
People from Bharuch
State cabinet ministers of Gujarat
Lok Sabha members from Gujarat
Bharatiya Janata Party politicians from Gujarat
India MPs 1989–1991
India MPs 1991–1996
India MPs 1996–1997
India MPs 1998–1999
Gujarat MLAs 1975–1980
Janata Party politicians